Mount Liupan is a mountain range in northwestern China, located mostly in southern Ningxia Hui Autonomous Region.  It marks the southwestern boundary of the Ordos Basin.

Its southern section is known as Mount Long, which strides southeast through eastern Gansu and western Shaanxi province before joining into the Qinling Mountains, giving rise to regional names like "Longxi" (陇西, lit. "west of Mount Long"), "Longdong" (陇东, "east of Mount Long", referring to the Jing River valley basin region around eastern Pingliang, southern Qingyang and northern Xianyang) and "Longnan" (陇南, "south of Mount Long").  It is the western boundary of the Guanzhong Plain, and is also the source of the Qian River (千河), a left tributary of the Wei River that flows through the prefectural city of Baoji.

Poem of the same name 
A poem of same name was dedicated to this mountain by Mao Zedong in 1935, when the Chinese Red Army arrived into the friendly Shaanbei region at the end of the Long March.

Geography 
It is one of the youngest mountain ranges of China. It is relatively narrow with a width between 5 and 12 km, and a length of around 240 km. Owing to its orientation perpendicular to humid winds, it is considered a 'green island' within the Loess Plateau. Most of the mountain's area is covered by forests.

Climate

See also 
 Guanzhong

References 

Mountain ranges of Gansu
AAAA-rated tourist attractions